Parvovirinae is a subfamily of viruses in the family Parvoviridae. There are ten genera and 84 species assigned to this subfamily.

Taxonomy
The following 10 genera are recognized:
Amdoparvovirus
Artiparvovirus
Aveparvovirus
Bocaparvovirus
Copiparvovirus
Dependoparvovirus
Erythroparvovirus
Loriparvovirus
Protoparvovirus
Tetraparvovirus

References

External links
  ICTV Parvovirinae

 
Parvoviruses
Virus subfamilies